Jerome Joseph Maake is a South African politician and apartheid political prisoner who has been the Chairperson of the Joint Standing Committee on Intelligence since 2019. A member of the African National Congress, Maake has been a Member of the National Assembly of South Africa since 2009.

Background
Maake graduated from the University of Western Cape with a Bachelor of Commerce degree and holds a degree in Business Management from Napier University. He has a Master's degree in Economic Policy from Stellenbosch University.

Maake joined the ANC in 1980 while in Swaziland. He was a UMkhonto we Sizwe (MK) soldier and trained in Angola. He returned to South Africa in 1981 and conducted MK operations in the then Northern Transvaal. In 1982 Maake was arrested and sentenced to thirteen years imprisonment at Robben Island. He appealed the sentence in 1985 and won the appeal. There was a re-trail in Pietermaritzburg and he was given a suspended sentence. After the 1985 State of Emergency, he left South Africa and travelled to Angola again and attended a MK refresher course. In 1986, he returned to South Africa again and operated in the Mawudse area.

Parliamentary career
In 2009, Maake was elected to the National Assembly of South Africa as an African National Congress representative and has been re-elected since in 2014 and 2019. He has served on the police, intelligence, defence, education, arts and culture, and public enterprises committees.

On 14 November 2019, he was appointed as chairperson of the Joint Standing Committee on Intelligence.

References

Living people
Year of birth missing (living people)
Place of birth missing (living people)
People from Limpopo
Anti-apartheid activists
Members of the National Assembly of South Africa
African National Congress politicians